Pardner or pardners may refer to:

Pardners, a 1956 American comedy movie
Pardners (1917 film), a lost 1917 American silent film
Pardner shotgun, manufactured by H&R Firearms

See also
Partner (disambiguation)